The Dudek Rex is a Polish single-place, paraglider that was designed and produced by Dudek Paragliding of Bydgoszcz. It is now out of production.

Design and development
The Rex was designed as an beginner glider for pilots undergoing flight training and also for novice pilots. It is made from Skytex material with Technora lines. The models are each named for their approximate wing area in square metres.

Operational history
Reviewer Noel Bertrand described the Rex in a 2003 review as "technically very elaborate".

Variants
Rex 25
Small-sized model for lightweight pilots.
Rex 27
Mid-sized model for medium weight pilots.
Rex 29
Large-sized model for heavier pilots.

Specifications (Rex-27)

References

External links

Rex
Paragliders